Ministrymon janevicroy, the Vicroy's ministreak, is a butterfly in the family Lycaenidae. It is found from the southern United States (Texas) to Costa Rica (Guanacaste). There are disjunct populations on the Venezuelan islands of Curaçao and Isla Margarita. The habitat consists of dry deciduous forests and scrubs.

The length of the forewings is 9.1 mm for both males and females. Adults resemble Ministrymon azia, but have olive green eyes instead of the dark brown/black eyes. In Texas, adults have been recorded on wing from January to August.

The larvae possibly feed on Mimosa and Leucaena species.

Etymology
The species is named for the wife of the author, Jane Vicroy Scott.

References

Eumaeini
Butterflies of Central America
Butterflies of the Caribbean
Butterflies of North America
Lycaenidae of South America
Butterflies described in 2013